RSS Formidable (68) is the lead ship of the Formidable-class stealth frigate of the Republic of Singapore Navy.

Construction and career 
RSS Formidable was built by DCNS company in France around the early 2000s. Formidable was commissioned on 5 May 2007.

RIMPAC 2012 
RSS Formidable participated in RIMPAC 2012 which lasts from 29 to 3 June August 2012. 22 nations and more than 40 warships took part in the exercise.

SIMBEX-16 
On 30 October 2016, RSS Formidable arrived in Visakhapatnam, India to prepare for naval exercise SIMBEX-16 in the Bay of Bengal.

Exercise Bersama Lima 18 
Singapore, Malaysia, Australia, New Zealand and UK held Exercise Bersama Lima from 2 to 19 October 2018. One of the ships participating was RSS Formidable.

Exercise Pacific Griffin 19 
RSS Formidable participated in Pacific Griffin 19 with its bilateral partner, the United States.

Exercise Pelican 22 
RSS Formidable participated in the 40th edition of Pelican with its bilateral partner, the Brunei

International Fleet Review 22 
RSS Formidable participated in the 70th edition of International Fleet Review celebrating the formation of JMSDF hosted by Japan

Gallery

References 

Ships of the Republic of Singapore Navy
2004 ships
Formidable-class frigates
Republic of Singapore Navy